The Audain Art Museum is a 56,000-square-foot private museum located in Whistler, British Columbia, housing the private art collection of Michael Audain. Designed by Patkau Architects and opened to the public in 2016, it holds a comprehensive permanent collection of British Columbian art.

Design 
The site is moderately forested, consisting of mature spruce and cedar trees. During the initial phase of construction, only one tree was removed in an effort to preserve the site's ecology. The museum's main entrance is accessible by bridge, connecting the site to Blackcomb Way. The intention of the design was to blend the building into the existing site; Michael Audain explains that the cladding “is an intentionally recessive colour—it recedes into the shadows, and that’s our view of the appropriate relationship between it and the context”.

John Patkau, Principal of Patkau Architects, describes the museum's design as being shaped by three prominent factors.  Firstly, its function as a gallery, housing both the permanent collection of Michael Audain in juxtaposition with temporary exhibits, changing intermittently. Second, the challenging site, located within the Fitzsimmons Creek floodplain, poses a flood risk on-site. Lastly, the enormous amount of snowfall that Whistler receives annually, which influenced the structure of the museum.

Accolades 
2017 Wood Design Honor Award
2017 AIBC Lieutenant Governor of British Columbia Medal in Architecture
2017 Azure AZ Award
2017 Canadian Wood Council Design Award
2018 RIBA Award for International Excellence
2018 Governor General's Medal in Architecture
2018 AIA Award - Architecture

Construction

Timeline 

 September 21, 2012: Michael Audain visits Whistler to choose a site.
 December 9, 2012: Michael Audain enters an agreement with the Resort Municipality of Whistler (RMOW) to build a 25,000-square-foot museum to house a portion of his British Columbia art collection.
 April 30, 2013: Michael Audain announces his decision to expand the art museum to 56,000-square-feet.
 August, 2013: Construction begins on site at 4350 Blackcomb Way, Whistler, BC.
 March 12, 2016: The Audain Art Museum opens to the public.

Structure 

The museum, located at the base of the Whistler Mountain, is suspended one full storey above ground in response to site within the Fitzsimmons Creek floodplain. The 145-meter-long, elbow-shaped structure is suspended upon seven piers as its foundation system. The primary structure's three-dimensional bridge-like steel frame spans between the piers and is mostly concealed. The floor diaphragms consist primarily of reinforced concrete supported by a steel deck, while the roof structure consists of pre-fabricated long-span engineered wood panels. The use of a single concrete core, located at the elbow joint, provides lateral load resistance in the longitudinal direction, while a series of transverse steel frames, equipped with high ductility connectors are used for the first time in a real-life application, providing transverse load resistance. The use of these complex hybrid steel/concrete structural systems provide sufficient rigidity for the structure to achieve its long interior spans and dramatic cantilevers.

Permanent collection 

The Audain Art Museum displays a Permanent Collection of nearly 200 works of art, visually highlighting a historic journey of art from coastal British Columbia. The works span from the 18th century to the modern era and present day, containing one of the finest preserved collections of Northwest Coast First Nations masks; a large collection of works by Emily Carr, encompassing all periods of her artistic career; as well as art by important post-war modernists such as E.J. Hughes, Gordon Smith and Jack Shadbolt. In addition to these historical works, the Collection showcases art by internationally renowned contemporary British Columbia artists including Jeff Wall, Dana Claxton, Marianne Nicolson, Rodney Graham and Stan Douglas, among others.

Accessibility 
The Audain Art Museum prioritizes the accessibility of art to all, with all public areas being wheelchair accessible for members of the public with limited mobility, as well as "touch tours" of the collection for members of the public with visual impairment.

Past exhibitions 
Since its inception, the Audain Art Museum has hosted numerous temporary exhibitions, displaying a variety of art works.
January 21 – May 22, 2017 Fred Herzog: Shadowlands.
June 10 – October 16, 2017 Edward Burtynsky: The Scarred Earth.
March 9 – April 9, 2018 Shawn Hunt: Transformation.
March 30 – June 11, 2018 Beau Dick: Revolutionary Spirit.
June 30 – September 17, 2018 POP.
October 6 – January 28, 2019 Ancestral Modern: Australian Aboriginal Art from the Kaplan & Levi Collection.
February 16 – May 6, 2019 Tales of an Empty Cabin: Somebody Nobody Was…
May 18 – August 26, 2019 Artistry Revealed: Peter Whyte, Catharine Robb Whyte and Their Contemporaries.
September 21 – January 20, 2020 Emily Carr: Fresh Seeing – French Modernism and the West Coast.
February 8 – October 18, 2020 The Extended Moment: Fifty Years of Collecting Photographs.
June 10 – September 6, 2021 Itee Pootoogook: Hymns to the Silence.
October 23, 2021 – February 21, 2022 Riopelle: The Call of Northern Landscapes and Indigenous Cultures.
April 2 – August 14, 2022 Wolves: The Art of Dempsey Bob.

Governance 
The Audain Art Museum is incorporated under the Canada Not-for-profit Corporations Act, effective October 4, 2012, and is a Registered Charity. The Museum's Board of Trustees serves as its governing body.

References

External links

Art museums and galleries in British Columbia
Buildings and structures in British Columbia
Modernist architecture in Canada
Whistler, British Columbia